Resurrected is the third and final full-length album by doom metal band Witchfinder General. It was released on 30 August 2008 in the U.S. on 2 September 2008 in the UK.

Track listing
All tracks written by Phil Cope.

 "The Living Hell" - 7:50
 "The Gift of Life" - 5:47
 "Final Justice" - 4:20
 "Bryn-Y-Mor" - 2:18
 "Brutal Existence" - 5:15
 "Euthanasia" - 5:25
 "A Night to Remember" - 4:28
 "The Funeral / Beyond the Grave" - 7:03

Personnel
Phil Cope - guitars
Dermot Redmond - drums
Rod Hawkes - bass
Gary Martin - vocals

2008 albums
Witchfinder General (band) albums